Ana Luiza Filiorianu (born July 10, 1999) is a Romanian individual rhythmic gymnast. She is the six-time (2011–14 and 2016–17) Romanian National All-around champion.

Personal life 
Ana Luiza started competitive gymnastics in 2006 at age 7 years, her sports hero is Romanian artistic gymnast Nadia Comăneci, the first female gymnast to score perfect 10's in the Olympic Games.

Career

Junior 
Ana Luiza appeared in international competitions in 2011, she competed at the 2013 Moscow Grand Prix she finished 9th in all-around, she competed in the junior division of the World Cup series at the 2013 Lisboa World Cup and 2013 Bucharest World Cup finishing 5th in all-around.

In 2014, Ana Luiza started her season competing at the Miss Valentine Cup in Tartu, Estonia winning 3 gold in (ball, clubs and ribbon) and 1 bronze (hoop), she then competed at the 2014 Moscow Grand Prix finishing 8th in the all-around, following her placement she earned a qualification for Romania to compete for the Youth Olympic Games. Ana Luiza competed in the World Cup series in Debrecen, qualifying to 2 event finals, she won silver medal in hoop and bronze in ball. Her next event was at the Pesaro World Cup. She won the all-around gold in Irina Deleanu Cup. On June 10–16, Ana Luiza competed at the 2014 European Junior Championships and qualified to 2 event finals placing 5th in clubs and 7th in hoop. She became three time Junior National all-around champion. Ana Luiza went to represent Romania at the 2014 Youth Olympic Games in Nanjing, China where she finished 4th in all-around finals behind America's Laura Zeng.

Senior 

In 2015, Ana Luiza made her senior international debut competing at the 2015 Moscow Grand Prix finishing 23rd in the all-around. On April 10–12, Ana Luiza finished 45th in the all-around at the 2015 Pesaro World Cup. On June 15–21, Ana Luiza competed at the inaugural 2015 European Games where she finished 18th in the all-around. In August, Ana Luiza finished 35th in the all-around at the 2015 Budapest World Cup and 22nd at the 2015 Sofia World Cup. On September 9–13, Ana Luiza competed at the 2015 World Championships in Stuttgart finishing 37th in the All-around qualifications and did not advance into the Top 24 finals.

In 2016, Ana Luiza started her season competing at the 2016 Gracia Cup in Budapest and finished 2nd in the all-around, she qualified to 4 event finals and finished 2nd in hoop, 4th in ball and 3rd in clubs, ribbon. On February 17–22, she competed at the 2016 Grand Prix Moscow finishing 19th in the all-around with a total of 66.916 points. On March 17–20, Ana Luiza then competed at the 2016 Lisboa World Cup where she finished 15th in the all-around. On April 1–3, Ana Luiza competed at the 2016 Pesaro World Cup where she finished 20th in the all-around with a total of 69.050 points. On April 21–22, Ana Luiza won an Olympics license by finishing sixth amongst a top 8 selection of highest score for non qualified gymnasts at the 2016 Gymnastics Olympic Test Event held in Rio de Janeiro. On May 13–15, Ana Luiza then finished 7th in the all-around at the 2016 Grand Prix Bucharest (a new PB: 70.750) behind Israel's Victoria Veinberg Filanovsky. On May 27–29, Ana Luiza finished 10th in the all-around at the 2016 Sofia World Cup with a total of 69.250 points. On July 8–10, Ana Luiza then finished 22nd in the all-around at the 2016 Kazan World Cup. On September 23–24, Ana Luiza culminated her season with her competition at the 2016 Grand Prix Final in Eilat, where she finished 8th in the all-around with a total of 67.683 points. On August 19–20, Ana Luiza competed at the 2016 Summer Olympics held in Rio de Janeiro, Brazil. She finished 22nd in the rhythmic gymnastics individual all-around qualifications and did not advance into the top 10 finals.

In 2017 season, Ana Luiza debuted her new routines at the 2017 Grand Prix Moscow finishing 12th in the all-around and qualified to the ball final. On March 17–19, Ana Luiza then competed at the Kiev Grand Prix finishing 8th in the all-around and qualifying in all finals. On April 7–9, Ana Luiza competed at the 2017 Pesaro World Cup finishing 15th in the all-around and qualifying in ball final. Her next competition was at the 2017 Baku World Cup where she finished 7th in the all-around and qualified in the ball and clubs final. On May 5–7, Ana Luiza competed at the 2017 Sofia World Cup finishing 14th in the all-around. On July 7–9, Ana Luiza finished 8th in the all-around at the 2017 Berlin World Challenge Cup, she qualified in clubs and ribbon final. On August 11–13, Ana Luiza competed at the 2017 Kazan World Challenge Cup finishing 17th in the all-around behind Italy's Veronica Bertolini. On August 30 – September 3, at the 2017 World Championships in Pesaro, Italy; Ana Luiza finished 14th in the all-around final, she did not advance into any apparatus finals.

In 2018 season, on March 30 – April 1, Ana Luiza began the season competing at the 2018 Sofia World Cup finishing 23rd in the all-around. Ana Luiza then competed at the 2018 Pesaro World Cup finishing 16th in the all-around. On April 27–29, Ana Luiza competed at the 2018 Baku World Cup where she placed her highest all-around placement finishing in 6th behind American Laura Zeng, she also qualified in 2 apparatus finals. On May 4–6, Ana Luiza then competed in a World Challenge event at the 2018 Guadalajara World Cup, she suffered a knee injury during her ball routine, she twisted her knee after falling from a backscale pivot, she was then assisted by paramedics and withdrawn from competition. On May 17 she had a knee reconstruction surgery and 1 month later started recovery. She started training again in mid-July, but had another surgery at the end of November.

In the 2019 season Ana Luiza entered the competition floor again for the first time after her accident,  on February 10, in Bologna, during the Serie A competition in Italy, competing for the famous Italian club AS Udinese, where they finished on the 3rd position. She competed for A.S.U. two more times, on February 23 winning silver with the team, and on March 16, winning the bronze and finishing the Serie A competition of 2019 on the 3rd place (helping AS Udinese to become the 3rd best team in Italy in 2019). From 29 to 31 March Ana Luiza competed in the Irina Deleanu Trophy finishing 4th in all-around and qualifying to the hoop and ribbon final where she won two bronze medals.

Routine music

References

External links 
 
 
 

1999 births
Living people
Romanian rhythmic gymnasts
Gymnasts at the 2014 Summer Youth Olympics
European Games competitors for Romania
Gymnasts at the 2015 European Games
Gymnasts at the 2016 Summer Olympics
Olympic gymnasts of Romania
Gymnasts from Bucharest